Bilbao Football Club was a football team based in Bilbao, Spain, which existed during the years 1900 and 1903. In 1902 they combined with city rivals Athletic Club to form Club Vizcaya, a team which won the 1902 Copa de la Coronación. The following year they were absorbed by Athletic Club.

History

Background 
Football arrived in Bilbao at the end of the 19th century, thanks to British visiting sailors and immigrant workers, such as the British employees of the Nervión Shipyards, located in Sestao (Vizcaya), who in 1889 formed a multi-sports club called Club Atleta, who began to play against crews of English ships coming from Portsmouth and Southampton and Sunderland. It was around this time that a group of British workers in the region (not linked to the shipyards) formed a team known as the Bilbao Football Club, which was also made up of British residents in the region, but not linked to the shipyards, such as Alfred Mills, who was a telegraph operator. In the winter of 1892–93, Club Atleta and Bilbao FC contested a "serious" tournament in the Hippodrome of Lamiako, a racetrack from where football took off in Bilbao, with several Bilbainos swarming the field to watch the teams of British workers challenge each other every weekend. Said tournament was won by Club Atleta, who received medals presented by James S. Clark on 22 April 1893.

Origins 
The football fever grew quickly in the city, and thus, just two years after seven football enthusiasts belonging to the Gimnásio Zamacois, who were also usuals in Lamiako, founded Athletic Club in 1898, Carlos Castellanos, the grandson of a wealthy banker of French origin, flanked by his brother Manuel, and a group of young Bilbainos from the upper class who had studied in England, founded the Bilbao Football Club on 30 November 1900, which was not related with the Bilbao club that existed in 1892–93, formed by the British. They created the new entity in an informal meeting held in the house that José Luis de Villabaso (1852–1917) had in the Biscayan neighborhood of Algorta. The new Bilbao FC was officially established shortly after its foundation since its regulations were approved by the civil governor and printed in 1901. A few months later, in February 1901, Athletic Club, probably encouraged by the first news about the founding of Bilbao FC, began conversations to officially establish the club, which they did on 5 September 1901, in the infamous meeting held in the Café García, in which the 33 members decided to make it official and register as a sports organization with the local council.

The Castellanos brothers were accompanied in the initiative by other young sportsmen from the high society in Las Arenas and Algorta, such as Luis Arana, Ricardo Ugalde (1877), Manuel Ansoleaga, Perico Larrañaga and Antonio Guinea, and other prominent figures from the local bourgeoisie, such as Santiago Martínez de las Rivas, the son of José Martínez Rivas, the owner of the Nervión Shipyards. The team would be joined by some British residents of Vizcaya such as Charlton Levick, Walter Evans, William Dyer, George Langford, and George Cockram.

Rivalry with Athletic Club 
Naturally, a rivalry soon arose between the two Bilbao teams. The Athletic team only had one foreigner in its ranks, Alfred Mills, while Bilbao FC was mostly made up of English players, such as Evans, Langford, Dyer and Cockram. Since there were hardly any fields in Bilbao, the two sides agreed to share the Lamiako field, which they rented together. Lamiako was thus the home to one of the first great rivalries in the history of Spanish football, with the first game between the two sides taking place on 10 November 1901, ending in a goalless draw.

This duel aroused great expectation, so both teams agreed to call a new match to define the winner of their meeting, which took place on 1 December and also ended in a draw (1–1), thus starting a series of matches in Lamiako, with the great rivalry between them serving as one of the drivers of football as a mass phenomenon in Bilbao. Two weeks later, on 15 December, the third game was held and ended in a 0–2 victory for Bilbao FC. Athletic was missing two players, including the mythical Juan Astorquia, who was unable to play due to being constipated, being replaced by R. Eguren, who at that time belonged to Athletic's second team. On the other hand, Bilbao FC was missing Manuel Ansoleaga who was not replaced, so both teams played with 10 players. Nothing remarkable happened in the first half, as the players were very cold due to the temperature. In the second half, however, all the players made an effort due to their desire to break the tie and define the winner. Bilbao FC took the lead thanks to Walter Evans, who scored after taking advantage of a kick missed by one of the Athletic players, and although Athletic fought back, Evans scored again in the dying minutes to seal the win.

Athletic's revenge came a month later, on 19 January 1902, in the fourth match, when they won 4–2. The latter game was the first time that a paid match was held in Vizcaya, since this time they charged a ticket price of 30 cents of a peseta. Athletic Club played with one more player, and thus they dominated the first half, scoring two goals via Juan Astorquia and Ramón Silva. In the second half, however, Bilbao FC's goalkeeper, Mr. Renovales, moved into midfield and Ansoleaga took over as goalkeeper. As a result of this change, they began to push much more and Bilbao FC was rewarded with a goal from William Dyer, and then the goals just began to fall into one goal and the other. Mario Arana from Athletic made it 3–1, then Walter Evans cut down the deficit for Bilbao FC, and finally, another from Astorquia sealed the win. The fifth match, which was held in March of 1902, ended with a new Athletic victory (1–0) with a goal from Eduardo Montejo. On 23 November 1902, they played another match which also ended in a 1–0 win to Athletic.

Club Bizcaya 

Despite the sporting rivalry between the two clubs, their relations were friendly, and thus, the two rivals agreed to join the best players of each club to play two games against the Bordeaux-based side Burdigala, beating them 0–2 in France, the first time a Bilbao team played on foreign territory, and 7–0 in Lamiako (four from Dyer and three from Astorquia), the very first visit by a foreign team to Bilbao, gathering a crowd of three thousand spectators, a tremendous amount at the time. This temporary merge became known as Club Bizcaya (with a B).

Taking advantage of the occasion of the coronation of Alfonso XIII, Madrid FC (now known as Real Madrid) organized the Copa de la Coronación, the first national championship disputed in Spain and the forerunner for the Copa del Rey which began in the following year. Upon an invitation from Madrid FC, Club Bizcaya was sent to Madrid to represent the city of Bilbao. The Basques played and won three games on consecutive days, defeating FC Barcelona in the final with goals from the captain Juan Astorquia and Armand Cazeaux, both of Athletic. They thus returned to Bilbao with the trophy presented by the mayor of Madrid.

Decline and Collapse 
Juan Astorquia, the then president and team captain of Athletic, used Bizcaya's successful campaign to convince Luis Arana of how necessary it was to merge the two clubs. Furthermore, the heat of the summer melted away the interest in football, with the owners of Bilbao FC losing interest in their team, which at the end of 1902 was going through a certain crisis, and in mid-autumn, it seemed that both Athletic and Bilbao FC were on the verge of collapse, so their only solution was to join forces, permanently. On 24 March 1903, Bilbao FC agreed at the General Meeting to dissolve the club and its remaining members and associates were officially and definitively swallowed up and absorbed by their rival, and the side that emerged from the unification was called Athletic Club de Bilbao. Once these critical moments were resolved, the successes continued to accompany Athletic, who have been crowned the Champions of Spain in 1903, 1904, 1910 and 1911.

Results

See also 
History of Athletic Bilbao

References

Defunct football clubs in the Basque Country (autonomous community)
Sports teams in Bilbao
1903 disestablishments in Spain
1900 establishments in Spain
Association football clubs established in 1900
Association football clubs disestablished in 1903
Athletic Bilbao
Getxo